The Secret of Castle Elmshoh (German: Das Geheimnis von Schloß Elmshöh) is a 1925 German silent crime film directed by Max Obal and starring Ernst Reicher, Gertrud de Lalsky and Anton Walbrook. It was made at the Emelka Studios in Munich in part of a long-running series featuring the detective Stuart Webbs.

Cast
 Ernst Reicher as Stuart Webbs
 Gertrud de Lalsky as Gräfin
 Anton Walbrook as Ihr Sohn Axel
 Georg Vogelsang as Georg
 Hermann Nesselträger as Großvater
 Hermann Picha as Pfarrer
 Ruth Weyher

References

External links

1925 films
Films of the Weimar Republic
Films directed by Max Obal
German silent feature films
1925 crime films
German black-and-white films
Films shot at Bavaria Studios
German crime films
Bavaria Film films
1920s German films